Old Police Barracks is a heritage-listed former police barracks and now clubhouse at 283 Sloane Street, Goulburn, Goulburn Mulwaree Council, New South Wales, Australia. It was added to the New South Wales State Heritage Register on 2 April 1999.

History 

The former barracks was built in 1874. It is now adaptively reused as part of the Railway Bowling Club.

Significance 
The Goulburn Police Barracks, erected in 1874 to cater for the needs of the increasing police force in the district, are of high local significance. The single storey barracks building is now adaptively reused as part of the Railway Bowling Club. Its heritage value lies in its early association with the provision of law enforcement services in Goulburn.

Heritage listing 
The Old Police Barracks was listed on the New South Wales State Heritage Register on 2 April 1999.

See also

References

Attribution

External links

New South Wales State Heritage Register
Buildings and structures in Goulburn, New South Wales
Police stations in New South Wales
Former Barracks in Australia
Articles incorporating text from the New South Wales State Heritage Register